The Papuan logrunner or New Guinea logrunner (Orthonyx novaeguineae) is a species of bird in the family Orthonychidae. It was formerly considered conspecific with the Australian logrunner.

Habitat and Location
It is found in the highlands of New Guinea. Its natural habitat is subtropical or tropical moist montane forests.

References

Papuan logrunner
Birds of New Guinea
Papuan logrunner
Taxonomy articles created by Polbot